This is the discography of DJ Antoine, a Swiss DJ and producer. Since 1997, He has released 13 studio albums and over 35 singles.

Albums

Studio albums

Live albums

Compilation albums

Remix albums

Extended plays 
 1999: The Disco Bassline EP
 2007: Moscow Dyagilev EP (DJ Vini vs. DJ Antoine)

DVDs

Singles

As lead artist

Certifications

References 

Discographies of Swiss artists